Varela is a station on Line E of the Buenos Aires Underground. The station was opened on 27 November 1985 as the western terminus of the one-line extension from Medalla Milagrosa. On 8 May 1986, the line was extended to Plaza de los Virreyes.

References

External links

Buenos Aires Underground stations